The 1934 Australian Grand Prix was a motor race held at the Phillip Island circuit in Victoria, Australia on 19 March 1934. The 200 mile race, which was organised by the Light Car Club of Australia, was the seventh Australian Grand Prix. Contested as a handicap race, it was won by Bob Lea-Wright, driving a Singer Nine.

Race classification 

Of the twenty starters, six completed the course within the prescribed time limit.

Key:
 NC: Not classified 
 DNF: Did not finish
 DNS: Did not start

Notes:
 Race distance: 31 laps, 206 miles, 
 Winner's race time: 3 hours 12 minutes 10 seconds
 Winning margin: 24 seconds
 Fastest lap: Bill Thompson, 4 minutes 43 seconds
 Fastest time: Bill Thompson, 2 hours 37 minutes and 21 seconds (Thompson was awarded the prize for the "Fastest time", this being actual running time, ignoring handicap.)

References

Grand Prix
Australian Grand Prix
Motorsport at Phillip Island
Australian Grand Prix